Kowsar is an Iranian land-based anti-ship missile.

Kowsar may also refer to:

Places
Kowsar, Khuzestan, Iran
Kowsareh, Khuzestan Province, Iran
Kowsar County, Ardabil Province, Iran
Kusar (disambiguation), name of several places

Sports
Kowsar Lorestan F.C., an Iranian football club
Kowsar Tehran F.C., an Iranian football club
Kowsar Isfahan F.C., an Iranian football club

Other uses
 HESA Kowsar, an Iranian fighter jet aircraft
 Kowsar Women Football League, Iranian women's football league 
 Nikahang Kowsar (born 1969), Canadian cartoonist

See also

Kowsari, a surname
Kausar, a given name